Lenka Zdeborová (born 24 November 1980) is a Czech physicist and computer scientist who applies methods from statistical physics to machine learning and constraint satisfaction problems. She is a professor of physics and computer science and communication systems at EPFL (École Polytechnique Fédérale de Lausanne).

Education and career
Zdeborová was born in Plzeň. She earned a master's degree in physics at Charles University in 2004, and in 2008, completed an international dual doctorate ("en cotutelle") at both Charles University and University of Paris-Sud. Her doctoral advisors were Václav Janiš at Charles University, and Marc Mézard at Paris-Sud.

After postdoctoral research at the Center for Nonlinear Studies of Los Alamos National Laboratory, she became a researcher for the French Centre national de la recherche scientifique (CNRS) in 2010, posted at the Institut de Physique Theorique of the French Alternative Energies and Atomic Energy Commission (CEA) in Paris-Saclay. She also earned a habilitation in 2015 at the École normale supérieure (Paris).

Recognition
Zdeborová won the CNRS Bronze medal in 2014. In 2016, the École normale supérieure (Paris) gave her the Philippe Meyer prize in theoretical physics. She is the 2018 winner of the Irène Joliot-Curie Prize for young female scientists.

References

External links
Home page at Charles University

1980 births
Living people
Czech physicists
Czech women computer scientists
French physicists
French computer scientists
Women physicists
Charles University alumni
Paris-Sud University alumni
Network scientists
Statistical physicists